Berggruen is a surname. Notable people with the surname include: 

Heinz Berggruen (1914–2007), German art dealer
Nicolas Berggruen (born 1961), American/German investor
Olivier Berggruen (born 1963), German-American art historian and curator

See also 
 Berggruen Prize
 Berggruen Institute
 Berggruen Museum